Betovo is a rural locality (a village) in Bryansky District, Bryansk Oblast, Russia. The population was 556 as of 2013. There are 6 streets.

Geography 
Betovo is located 9 km northwest of Glinishchevo (the district's administrative centre) by road. Gorodets is the nearest rural locality.

References 

Rural localities in Bryansky District